Eugene Gray (born 12 May 1974 in Liberia) is a Liberian retired footballer.

Career

Indonesia
Previously on the books of Persitara Jakarta Utara, Gray stated that the football in Indonesia is more organized, elaborating that money is put into the sport there and that it is advanced compared to India as well.

India
Taking the place of Theodore Sunday Wrobeh in time for Mohammedan's 25 January 2009 matchday at Air India, the Liberian's role was to get the Black and Whites out of the relegation zone, but they finished 11th out of 12th.

Despite putting Mohammedan 2–0 up over East Bengal, the game ended 2–2, after which the Liberia international claimed that they did not try to systematically hold on to their lead.

Trivia
In February 1996, he was on unsuccessful trial at Croatian side Hajduk Split.

References

External links 
 at National-Football-Teams 
 at Soccerway

Liberia international footballers
Mohammedan SC (Kolkata) players
Salgaocar FC players
United SC players
Muktijoddha Sangsad KC players
Persidago Gorontalo players
Liberian footballers
Liberian expatriate footballers
Association football forwards
Expatriate footballers in Bangladesh
Expatriate footballers in India
Expatriate footballers in Indonesia
Junior Professional FC players
FC Kochin players
Persitara Jakarta Utara players
Persmin Minahasa players
I-League players
1974 births
Living people
Place of birth missing (living people)
Calcutta Football League players